Nacional Atlético Clube, commonly known as Nacional de Cabedelo, is a Brazilian football club based in Cabedelo, Paraíba state.

History
The club was founded on April 21, 1973. Nacional de Cabedelo won the Campeonato Paraibano Second Level in 2004.

Achievements
 Campeonato Paraibano Second Level:
 Winners (1): 2004

Stadium
Nacional Atlético Clube play their home games at Estádio Francisco Figueiredo de Lima. The stadium has a maximum capacity of 5,000 people.

References

Association football clubs established in 1973
Football clubs in Paraíba
1973 establishments in Brazil